Kristine Elezaj, also known as Kebe, is an American singer. She rose to prominence when Nick Ashford invited her to perform with him and his wife Valerie better known as Motown legends Ashford and Simpson at their hip New York City venue Sugar Bar. Kristine released her first single "Let You Know" a year ago followed by "Souvenirs".

Early life 
Kristine Elezaj is of Albanian descent. Her parents moved to the United States from Ulcinj, Montenegro.

Rally car driver 
Kristine has a large fan base among rally car fans that already know Kristine from her national appearances at rallies around the country and her regular guest host spot on the Sirius Radio Maxim Channel show "RPM." Kristine drove in her 4th Celebrity Car Rally "Bullrun," the most glamorous of the high-end automotive rallies in June 2009. In 2008 she drove a BMW in the popular Fireball Run Adventurally series and aided in its Race to Recover America's Missing Children, where she met legendary Guitarist James Burton. She has shared the road with drivers and names such as Mario Andretti, Carl Lewis, Paris Hilton, Hayden Christensen and more.

Music career 
Kristine released her first single "Let You Know" along with a music video late 2009. In early 2010, Kristine then released "Souvenirs" with its music video which was credited as having dance moves like the young Britney Spears. Kristine has been working hard for the last year and a half with her manager/A&R and Co-Executive producer Roy P. Perez©, on her debut album "No Questions Remain" which is now set for October 19, 2010. The demo of the new single "Warpath" leaked online in August 2010, shortly after which the final was released. "Warpath" was released onto iTunes and Amazon with another song from her album "Rockstar". Several songs from her debut have leaked online including Crazy, Kidnap the DJ, Living Dream (ft. Red Cafe) and Good Girl Bad Boy (ft. Epic Crazy Town). Clips of songs from her debut album have been posted on Kristine's official YouTube sparking interest by many. The album has been noted as being a collection of club ready songs, with a few powerful ballads including Light Years, Always (available on iTunes now), and Momentum which was posted on Kristine's Myspace. Kristine's album boasts mixing by multi grammy winning, and multi platinum mix engineers Ken Lewis, Serban Ghenea, and Ken "DURO" Ifill.In 2012, Elezaj confirmed the release of her upcoming single "Monster."

Discography

Albums

Extended plays

Singles

In popular culture
The single "Razor" was re-used as a demo for the South Korean girl group f(x) or 에프엑스 with the title "Pinocchio (Danger)"" in 2011.

References 

http://www.dancetrackmagazine.com/?p=1204

External links 
 Official Website
 MateoMagazine.com Article
 Venus Zine Presents: Kristine Elezaj at Lollapalooza 2010

Living people
1985 births
Singers from New York (state)
American women pop singers
American people of Albanian descent
21st-century American singers
21st-century American women singers